Nationality words link to articles with information on the nation's poetry or literature (for instance, Irish or France).

Events
 Niccolò Machiavelli writes L'asino ("The [Golden] Ass")

Works published
 Teofilo Folengo, writing under the pen name "Merlin Cocaio", Opus Maccaronicum, collection of satiric poems, including Baldo; a blend of Latin with various Italian dialects in hexameter verse; many subsequent editions
 Johannes de Hauvilla, Architrenius, written in 1184, a widely read Latin poem in 4,361 hexameters in nine books; "edito princeps" (first printed edition) published this year by Josse Badius Ascensius
 Francysk Skaryna, The Psalter, Old Belarusian language, printed August 6 by Skaryna at his press in Prague, one of the first book printers in Eastern Europe
 John Skelton, The Tunnynge of Elynour Rummyng, comic poem about tavern life; Great Britain

Births
Death years link to the corresponding "[year] in poetry" article:
 July 25 – Jacques Pelletier du Mans (died 1582), French humanist poet
 Bargeo (died 1596), Italian, Latin-language poet
 Approximate date
 Robert Crowley (died 1588), English stationer, poet, polemicist and Protestant clergyman
 Henry Howard, Earl of Surrey (died 1547), English aristocrat and poet

Deaths
Birth years link to the corresponding "[year] in poetry" article:
 August – Andrea Ammonio (born 1478), Italian, Latin-language poet
 Gerolamo Bologni (born 1454), Italian, Latin-language poet
 Cornelio Paolo Amalteo (born c. 1460), Italian, Latin-language poet
 Girolamo Amaseo (born 1467), Italian, Latin-language poet
 Approximate date – Fausto Andrelino (born c. 1462), Italian, Latin-language poet

See also

 Poetry
 16th century in poetry
 16th century in literature
 French Renaissance literature
 Grands Rhétoriqueurs
 Renaissance literature
 Spanish Renaissance literature

Notes

16th-century poetry
Poetry